Symi, also transliterated as Syme or Simi, is a Greek island and municipality. It is mountainous and includes the harbor town of Symi and its adjacent upper town Ano Symi, as well as several smaller localities, beaches, and areas of significance in history and mythology. Symi is part of the Rhodes regional unit.

The economy of Symi was traditionally based on the shipbuilding and sponge industries. The population reached 22,500 at its peak during that period. Symi's main industry is now tourism, and its permanent population has declined to 2,495 with a larger population during the summer.

The island is known for its unique shrimps. Named "Symi's shrimps", these are small shrimps that are pan fried and eaten whole (with the shell).

Geography

Its nearest land neighbors are the Datça and Bozburun peninsulas of Muğla Province in Turkey. Its interior is dotted with small valleys, and its coastline alternates between rocky cliffs and beaches, and isolated coves. Its main town, located on the northeast coast, is also named Symi and consists of the lower town around the harbour, typically referred to as Yialos, and the upper town is called Horio or Ano Symi. Other inhabited localities are Pedi, Nimborio, Marathounda and Panormitis. Panormitis is the location of the island's famous monastery which is visited by people from all over the world, and many Greeks pay homage to St Michael of Panormitis each year. The island has 2,580 inhabitants, mostly engaged in tourism, fishing, and trade. In the tourist season which lasts from Easter until Panormitis Day in early November, tourists and day-trippers increase the number of people on the island to as much as 6000. In addition to its many historical sites, the island's isolated beaches, many reachable only with small boats, are popular with tourists. The Municipality of Sými includes the uninhabited offshore islets of Gialesíno, Diavátes, Kouloúndros, Marmarás, Nímos, Sesklío, and Chondrós.

History
In Greek mythology, Symi is reputed to be the birthplace of the Charites and to take its name from the nymph Syme (in antiquity the island was known as Aigli and Metapontis), though Pliny the Elder and some later writers claimed that the name was derived from simia, "a monkey".
In Homer's Iliad the island is mentioned as the domain of King Nireus, who fought in the Trojan War on the side of the Greeks and was described as the handsomest man in the Achaean forces, after Achilles. Thucydides writes that during the Peloponnesian War there was a Battle of Syme near the island in January, 411 BC, in which an unspecified number of Spartan ships defeated a squadron of Athenian vessels. Little was known about the island until the 14th century, but archaeological evidence indicates that it was continuously inhabited, and ruins of citadels suggest that it was an important location. It was first part of the Roman Empire and then the Byzantine Empire, until its conquest by the Knights of St. John in 1309.

Early modern: Hospitaller and Ottoman eras

This conquest, fueled by the Knights' interest in shipping and commerce, launched what was to be a period of several centuries of prosperity for Symi, as its location amidst the Dodecanese made it an important waypoint for trade until the advent of steam-powered shipping in the 19th century. The island was conquered from the Knights by the Ottoman Empire in 1522 (along with nearby Rhodes) but it was allowed to retain many of its privileges, so its prosperity continued virtually uninterrupted. Under the Ottomans the island was called Sömbeki. Symi was noted for its sponges which provided much of its wealth. It attained the height of its prosperity in the mid 19th century, and many of the peculiarly colorful neoclassical mansions covering the slopes near the main city date from that period. Although Symiots took part in the Greek War of Independence of 1821–1829, it was left out of the new Greek state when its borders were drawn up and so remained under Ottoman rule.

Modern era

The island, along with the rest of the Dodecanese, changed hands several times in the 20th century: in 1912 the Dodecanese declared independence from the Ottomans as the Federation of the Dodecanese Islands, though they were almost immediately occupied by Italy. The island was formally ceded to Italy in 1923, and on 12 October 1943 it was occupied by the Nazis. At the end of World War II, the surrender of German forces in the region took place on Symi to the British and the island was subject to three years of occupation by them as a result. Symi was finally rejoined with Greece in 1948.

The island has become a haven for tourists from abroad, especially British and Italians, and is now the permanent home of about 120 non-Greek residents, some 50 of whom are British. The influx of tourists has led to the restoration of a great number of homes (many of which were destroyed during World War II); these restorations, by law, have to conform to "guidelines laid down by the Greek culture ministry's Archaeological Service." Between 1998 and 2006, it is estimated that the price of a "ruin" on Symi increased fivefold. The growing population of EU expatriates has led to demographic as well as political changes, since EU citizens are allowed to vote in local elections and have attempted to exert influence on the island's politics. Opinions on whether this is a sign of growing integration differ.

There has been considerable restoration of many houses in Symi in the past decade, by architects including Haris A. Kalligas and Anastasia Papaioannou, both winners of the Europa Nostra Awards for their work on Symi and elsewhere in Greece.

Culture

Landmarks
 The Monastery of the Archangel Michael Panormitis is a Greek Orthodox monastery built on the southwest coast in the early 18th century. It overlooks a bay, and is still inhabited by monks.
 The Kastro overlooks the main town of Symi, Ano Symi. It was built by the Knights of St. John as an expansion of a Byzantine castle on the same site, many parts of which are still visible. There are also remnants of an ancient citadel on which the two later castles were built.
 The municipal clock tower which was built circa 1880
 The War memorial in the harbour consists of a monument "the Dove of Peace" in front of a bas-relief sculpture of a Trireme
 The town of Symi alone has thirteen major churches and dozens of chapels, some dating back to the Byzantine era.
 The village of Nimborio has surviving ancient Pelasgian walls and a set of twelve domes remaining from workshops used by artists.

Festival
Since 1995, Symi has hosted the Symi Festival during the months of July to September.  This festival was founded by Greek political journalist, Ioannis (John) Diakogiannis , who established it in the birthplace of his father Eleftherios C. Diakogiannis. Since its inception it has attracted many Greek musicians (Katy Garbi, Eleftheria Arvanitaki, Glykeria, Alkistis Protopsalti, Dimitra Galani, Miltos Pasxahildis etc.) to perform at free open-air concerts in the main square of Yialos, and also consists of many dance and theatre events.

Sister cities
In 2008, Tarpon Springs, Florida, a town with a high percentage of Greek Americans located on the Gulf Coast of the United States, established a sister city-relationship with Symi, which had sent many sponge fishermen to Florida for the "sponge rush" at the beginning of the twentieth century.

Local media
The island boasts one local amateur AM radio station, Radio Symi, broadcasting on 1485 KHz.

Notable people
Costas Valsamis, sculptor
Ioannis Diakidis, writer

See also
List of traditional Greek place names

References

External links

 Official website 

Islands of Greece
Dodecanese
Municipalities of the South Aegean
Populated places in Rhodes (regional unit)
Landforms of Rhodes (regional unit)
Islands of the South Aegean
Members of the Delian League
Populated places in the ancient Aegean islands